

The Kings of Viking Waterford (914–1170)
The Vikings, who had created a longphort near Waterford in 853, finally settled and created a town in 914. These were led by Ottir Iarla. Ragnall ua Ímair then installed himself over them in 917, however leaving a year later for Britain, with Ottir, and presumably placing a deputy in control. Several of the 11th-century Norse kings, the descendants of Ímar (died 1000), were both allied to and vassals of the powerful O'Brien dynasty, with whom they may also have intermarried, and who in at least one case in the 1070s (Diarmait, son of Toirrdelbach Ua Briain) exercised direct rule over the small city.

 Ottir Iarla (914–917)
 Ragnall ua Ímair (917-920/1)
 Ímar (died 1000)
 Ragnall mac Ímair (died 1018)
 Sitriuc mac Ímair (died 1022)
 Ragnall ua Ímair (reigned 1022–1035)
 Cú Inmain ua Robann (died 1037)
 Wadter (?-?)
 Ragnall Mac Gilla Muire (?-1170)
 O'Faoláin (?-1170)

The fate of the Waterford Norse is uncertain after the Norman invasion. Forced out of their own city, they are recorded occupying some of the surrounding countryside for a period afterwards. Also uncertain is how long the Uí Ímair continued to provide rulers.

Early Cambro-Norman Rulers (1170–1284)
This is a list of rulers of Waterford, nominal or otherwise, from the early Cambro-Norman period until the succession of mayors. While the first known charter was issued in 1205 by King John of England, the city had been declared to be a royal city by King Henry II of England in 1171. It is known that Waterford had a Provost in 1195, so certainly there was a civil administration prior to the establishment of the mayoralty. Source for information in this section:.

11. Richard de Clare, 2nd Earl of Pembroke (Strongbow) (1170)
12. Raymond le Gros (aka Raymond Fitzgerald) (1170)
13. King Henry II of England (1171)

(Provosts of Waterford preceded the mayors. – Need to be added.)

Mayors of Waterford (1284 – present day)
The mayor of Waterford wears a traditional gold chain during official duties.

The links on the chain commemorate individual past mayors, though the families of the mayors themselves are responsible for providing each link. Thus the number of links is far less than the total number of past mayors. Links may be added retroactively, usually by the descendants of past mayors.

Mayors are listed by year. Sources (Years 1377–1891), (Other years).

1284–1299
1284 – Roger le Lom
1285 – Roger le Lom
1285 – 1286  There were no mayors. The city was administered by the Escheator of Ireland.
1294 – John le Tyler
1295 – John le Tyler
1296 – Ralph de Hampton
1297 – Ralph de Hampton
1298 – Ralph de Hampton
1299 – Ralph de Hampton

1300–1399
1300 – Ralph de Hampton
1301 – 1376 ***Require mayors for these dates.
1377 – William Lumbard
1378 – William Lumbard
1379 – William Chapman
1380 – William Madan
1381 – Philip Spell
1382 – Robert Sweetman
1383 – Robert Sweetman
1384 – William Lumbard
1385 – William Forstall
1386 – Robert Bruce
1387 – William Lumbard
1388 – William Poer
1389 – William Poer
1390 – Milo Poer
1391 – Walter Spence
1392 – William Chapman
1393 – John Rocket
1394 – Milo Poer
1395 – William Forstall
1396 – William Attamen
1397 – William Lincolne
1398 – Andrew Archer
1399 – John Eyenas

1400–1499
1400 – William Forstall
1401 – John Lumbard
1402 – John Lumbard
1403 – Nicholas Lumbard
1404 – William Poer
1405 – William Poer
1406 – Richard Brushbone
1407 – John Walsh
1408 – John Lumbard
1409 – Walter Attamen
1410 – William Power
1411 – John Roberts
1412 – John Rocket
1413 – Simon Wickins
1414 – John White
1415 – Nicholas Holland
1416 – William Russell
1417 – William Lincolne (or Lyncoll)
1418 – John Lumbard
1419 – John Lumbard
1420 – Roger Walsh
1421 – Simon Wickins
1422 – Thomas O'Kabrane
1423 – William Lincolne
1425 – Thomas O'Kabrane
1426 – William Lincolne
1427 – Peter Strong
1428 – Robert Lincolne
1429 – Peter Rice
1430 – Walter Attam
1431 – Peter Strong
1432 – Gilbert Dyer
1433 – Foulke Commerford
1434 – Peter Strong
1435 – Nicholas Gough
1436 – John Corr
1437 – John White
1438 – Nicholas Mulgan
1439 – John Rope
1440 – Thomas Hull
1441 – Nicholas Gough
1442 – William Stattadel
1443 – Nicholas Mulgan
1444 – Nicholas Mulgan
1445 – William Corr
1446 – William Corr
1447 – John Rope
1448 – Foulke Commerford
1449 – William Lincolne
1450 – William White
1451 – Richard Walsh
1452 – Maurice Wise
1453 – Patrick Rope
1454 – John Madan
1455 – William White
1456 – Robert Butler
1457 – John Madan
1458 – Richard Walsh
1459 – William White
1460 – Laurence Dobbin
1461 – John May
1462 – John Sherlock
1463 – John Corr
1464 – John Corr
1465 – Peter Strong
1466 – Nicholas Mulgan
1467 – John Butler
1468 – John Mulgan
1469 – James Rice
1470 – Nicholas Devereux
1471 – James Rice
1472 – James Rice
1473 – John Corr
1474 – John Corr
1475 – Peter Sherlock
1476 – Peter Lovet
1477 – James Rice
1478 – William Lincolne
1479 – John Corr
1480 – James Sherlock
1481 – Maurice Wyse
1482 – John Butler
1483 – James Rice
1484 – James Rice
1485 – Richard Strong
1486 – James Rice
1487 – John Butler
1488 – James Rice
1489 – Robert Lumbard
1490 – William Lumbard
1491 – Patrick Rope
1492 – William Lumbard
1493 – Robert Butler
1494 – Henry Fagan
1495 – John Madan

Charter was revoked between the years 1495 to 1509 inclusive for an unknown reason.

1500–1599
1510 – John Madan
1511 – John Butler
1512 – Nicholas Madan
1513 – John Madan
1514 – James Butler
1515 – Nicholas Madan
1516 – John Madan
1517 – Patrick Rope
1518 – Nicholas Madan
1519 – James Sherlock
1520 – John Madan
1521 – Richard Walsh
1522 – Peter Walsh
1523 – Nicholas Wyse
1524 – John Madan
1525 – James Sherlock
1526 – John Morgan
1527 – Nicholas Wyse
1528 – Patrick Walsh
1529 – James Sherlock
1530 – John Morgan
1531 – Nicholas Wyse
1532 – Patrick Walsh
1533 – William Wyse
1534 – James Sherlock
1535 – William Lincolne
1536 – John Morgan
1537 – Thomas Lumbard
1538 – Edward Sherlock
1539 – James Walsh
1540 – William Wyse
1541 – Peter Dobbin
1542 – James White
1543 – William Lincolne
1544 – Edward Sherlock
1545 – Thomas Lumbard
1546 – Peter Dobbin
1547 – James Walsh
1548 – James Madan
1549 – Thomas Sherlock
1550 – Walter Coltie
1551 – David Walsh
1552 – Peter Dobbin
1553 – James Dobbin
1554 – Maurice Wyse
1555 – Robert Walsh
1556 – Henry Walsh
1557 – Peter Dobbin
1558 – Maurice Wyse
1559 – John Sherlock
1560 – Peter Strong
1561 – John Wise
1562 – James Walsh
1563 – Henry Wyse
1564 – Peter Walsh
1565 – John Neal
1566 – Peter Alyward
1567 – Patrick Dobbin
1568 – Nicholas Alyward
1569 – Peter Walsh
1570 – Phillip Cummerford
1571 – George Wyse
1572 – John Maden
1573 – John Maden
1574 – James Walsh
1575 – James Butler
1576 – Peter Sherlock
1577 – Peter Alyward
1578 – Sir Patrick Walsh
1579 – Patrick Dobbin
1580 – James Sherlock
1581 – Richard Lestrange
1582 – Nicholas Lee
1583 – James Maden
1584 – John Leonard
1585 – Nicholas Cummerford
1586 – James Wyse
1592 – Nicholas Aylward
1593 – Patrick Morgan
1594 – Paul Sherlock
1595 – James White.
1596 – Thomas Wadding
1597 – Paul Strong
1598 – Thomas White
1599 – Richard Madan

1600–1699
1600 – Sir Edward Gough
1601 – Robert Walsh
1602 – Robert Walsh
1603 – James Lombard
1604 – Richard Madan
1605 – Thomas Wyse
1606 – John Sherlock
1607 – Thomas Strong
1608 – Stephen Leonard
1609 – Stephen Leonard
1610 – James Levett
1611 – Richard Wadding
1612 – Michael Browne
1613 – Robert Walsh
1614 – Walter Sherlock
1615 – Nicholas White
1616 – John Joy
1617 – Alexander Brien
From 1617 to 1626, inclusive, there was no settled form of government in the city, owing to the refusal of the Roman Catholic Mayors to take the Oath of Supremacy.
1626 – James Woodlock
1627 – Sir Peter Aylward
1628 – John Sherlock
1629 – William Dobbin
1630 – Robert Wyse
1631 – James Walsh
1632 – Sir Thomas Sherlock
1633 – Sir Thomas Gough
1634 – Richard Strong
1635 – John Skiddy
1636 – Richard Butler
1637 – James White
1638 – Nicholas Wyse
1639 – Robert Lumbard
1640 – Mathew Grant
1641 – Francis Briver
1642 – Thomas White
1643 – Redmond Gerald
1644 – Luke White
1645 – Garret Lincolne
1646 – Paul Wadding
1647 – John Bluet
1648 – Sir John Walsh
1649 – John Levett
1650 – John Aylward
1651 – From 1650 to 1658 the City was governed by Commissioners appointed by Oliver Cromwell.
1656 – George Cawdron
1657 – Thomas Watts
1658 – Andrew Richard
1659 – John Houghton
1660 – Sir Thomas Dancer
1661 – Wiliam Halsey
1662 – William Bolton
1663 – John Eyeres
1664 – Thomas Christmas
1665 – George Deyos
1666 – Andrew Richard
1667 – Thomas Exton
1668 – John Heavens
1669 – John Heavens
1670 – William Hurst
1671 – Thomas Bolton
1672 – Henry Aland
1673 – Thomas Coote
1674 – Joseph Ivie
1675 – Michael Head
1676 – Henry Seagar
1677 – William Cooper
1678 – William Denis
1679 – Richard Seay
1680 – Zachary Clayton
1681 – William Fuller
1682 – Richard Maybank
1683 – William Fuller
1684 – Michael Head
1685 – William Godrick
1686 – William Godrick
1687 – Richard Fitzgerald
1688 – Richard Fitzgerald
1689 – Richard Fitzgerald
1690 – David Lloyde
1691 – Thomas Wyse and David Lloyde
1692 – Nicholas Porter
1693 – Francis Barker
1694 – Joseph Hopkins
1695 – Richard Christmas
1696 – John Mason
1697 – Sir John Mason
1698 – William Smith
1699 – Thomas Smith

1700–1799
1700 – John Head
1701 – Theodore Jones
1702 – William Weekes
1703 – John Lambe and John Japp
1704 – William Jones
1705 – David Lewis
1706 – James Eccles
1707 – James Eccles and David Lewis
1708 – David Lewis
1709 – Sir John Mason
1710 – David Lewis
1711 – David Lewis
1712 – John Mason
1713 – Francis Barker
1714 – Samuel Austin
1715 – Thomas Christmas
1716 – William Jones
1717 – Thomas Aikenhead
1718 – Thomas Aikenhead
1719 – Benjamin Morris
1720 – John Moore
1721 – Thomas Aikenhead
1722 – John Morris
1723 – Joseph Ivie
1724 – Wuham Alcock
1725 – Thomas Christmas
1726 – Simon Vashon
1727 – Simon Newport
1728 – Edward Weekes
1729 – Joseph Ivie
1730 – Henry Mason
1731 – Richard Weekes
1732 – John Moore
1733 – William Barker
1734 – Henry Mason
1735 – William Morgan
1736 – Ambrose Congreve
1737 – Samuel Barker
1738 – Simon Vashon, jun.
1739 – Simon Vashon, jun.
1740 – Robert West
1741 – Samuel Barker
1742 – Robert Glen
1743 – Cornelius Bolton
1744 – Beverley Ussher
1745 – William Ecles
1746 – Christmas Paul
1747 – Francis Barker
1748 – Thomas Christmas and Robert Glen
1749 – William Paul
1750 – William Paul
1751 – William Paul and George Bakas
1752 – Samuel Barker
1753 – William Alcock
1754 – William Morgan
1755 – Thomas Myles
1756 – Simon Newport
1757 – Henry Alcock
1758 – Thomas West
1759 – Benjamin Morris
1760 – Michael Hobbs
1761 – Michael Hobbs and Cornelius Bolton
1762 – Thomas Myles
1763 – George Wilkinson
1764 – William Alcock
1765 – John Lyon
1766 – Henry Alcock
1767 – William Price
1768 – William Alcock
1769 – Bolton Lee
1770 – Benjamin Morris
1771 – Francis Barker
1772 – William Bates
1773 – William Hobbs
1774 – John Lander
1775 – James Henry Reynett
1776 – James Henry Reynett
1777 – Henry Alcock, jun.
1778 – Simon Newport
1779 – Samuel Morgan
1780 – William Paul
1781 – William Alcock
1782 – Simon John Newport
1783 – James Moore
1784 – William Newport
1785 – John Alcock
1786 – Samuel King
1787 – Benjamin Morris
1788 – William Weekes
1789 – Thomas Alcock
1790 – John Ramsay
1791 – Thomas Price
1792 – Sir Simon Newport
1793 – Thomas Price and James Moore
1794 – Edmond Stevenson
1795 – Benjamin Morris, jun.
1796 – Simon Newport
1797 – James Sempill
1798 – Samuel Boyce
1799 – James Sempill

1800–1891
1800 – Samuel King
1801 – Samuel Morgan
1802 – James Henry Reynett
1803 – Henry Alcock
1804 – James Henry Reynett
1805 – James Moore
1806 – Robert Lyon
1807 – William Alcock
1808 – Robert Lyon
1809 – John Burchall
1810 – Cornelius Bolton
1811 – John Denis
1812 – James Henry Reynett
1813 – Henry Sergeant
1814 – Robert Lyon
1815 – Harry Alcock
1816 – Cornelius Bolton
1817 – Samuel Morgan
1818 – Sir John Newport
1819 – James Hackett
1820 – Samuel King
1821 – William Murphy
1822 – Edward Weeks
1823 – James Hackett
1824 – Sir Simon Newport
1825 – John Snow
1826 – Edward Villiers Briscoe, mayor-elect, having died 10 September; Alderman Snow held the rod until 20 November (Ald. Snow died 22 November 1826), when, by mandamus from the King's Bench, the Common Council elected and swore in Henry Holdsworth Hunt, who died 25 June 1827, and was succeeded by Henry Alcock.
1827 – Thomas Carew
1828 – William Weekes
1829 – Michael Evelyn
1830 – Edmond Skottowe
1831 – Henry Alcock
1832 – Adam Rogers
1833 – William Hobbs
1834 – Thomas McCheane
1835 – Alexander Mann Alcock
1836 – John Harris
1837 – Matthew Poole
1838 – William M. Ardagh
1839 – Edward Hobson
1840 – Simon Newport
1841 – Thomas L. Mackesy, Municipal Reform Act came into operation on 7 November 1841.
1842 – Thomas L. Mackesy
1843 – Thomas Meagher
1844 – Thomas Meagher
1845 – Sir B. Morris
1846 – Sir B. Norris Wall
1847 – Owen Carroll
1848 – Silvester Phelan
1849 – James Kent
1850 – Richard Cooke
1851 – John Power
1852 – Michael Dobbyn
1853 – Thomas F. Strange
1854 – Henry Denny
1855 – John Aloysius Blake
1856 – John Aloysius Blake
1857 – John Aloysius Blake
1858 – John Everard Feehan
1859 – John Mackesy
1860 – Thomas Murphy
1861 – Pierse Cox
1862 – William Johnson
1863 – Andrew Ryan
1864 – John Lawler
1865 – John Lawler
1866 – P. K. Reid
1867 – Sir B. Morris, knt.
1868 – Patrick Anthony Power
1869 – Cornelius Redmond
1870 – Thomas Wilson
1871 – Henry Francis Slattery
1872 – James F. Scott
1873 – St. George Freeman
1874 – William Kent Cummins
1875 – John Thomas Ryan
1876 – John Thomas Ryan
1877 – Thomas Purcell
1878 – Patrick Manning
1879 – George I. Mackesy
1880 – Laurence A. Ryan
1881 – Laurence A. Ryan
1882 – Laurence A. Ryan
1883 – William Kelly
1884 – John Allingham
1885 – John Allingham
1886 – Richard Power
1887 – Richard Power
1888 – Thomas Toole
1889 – Thomas Toole
1890 – Thomas Toole
1891 – John Manning
1892 – John Manning
1893 – John Manning
1894 – Anthony Cadogan
1895 – William J. Smith
1896 – William J. Smith
1897 – James Knox
1898 – Henry Grainger
1899 – Laurence C. Strange

1900–1999
1900 – Alexander Nelson
1901 – Richard Hearne
1902 – Richard Hearne
1903 – James A. Power
1904 – Sir James A. Power
1905 – Sir James A. Power
1906 – Maurice Quinlan
1907 – Maurice Quinlan
1908 – Thomas Whittle
1909 – Thomas Whittle
1910 – James Hackett
1911 – James Hackett
1912 – Michael Kirwan
1913 – Richard Power
1914 – Richard Power
1915 – Richard Power
1916 John J. O'Sullivan
1917 John J. O'Sullivan
1918 David MacDonald
1919 David MacDonald
1920 Vincent J. White
1921 Vincent J. White
1922 Vincent J. White
1923 Vincent J. White
1924 Vincent J. White
1925–1926 (a) Vincent J. White
1925–1926 (b) Richard Keane
1926 John J. Wyley
1927 John J. Wyley
1928 Edward Walsh
1929 Edward Walsh
1930 William Jones
1931 William Jones
1932 Matthew Cassin
1933 Matthew Cassin
1934 Edward Dawson
1935 James Aylward
1936 James Aylward
1937 James Aylward
1938 James Aylward
1939 James Aylward
1940 James Aylward
1941 Thomas Dunne
1942 Paul Caulfield
1943 William Jones
1944 Bryan Cunningham
1945 William Kenneally
1946 Michael Coffey
1947 John F. Gloster
1948 Thaddeus Lynch
1949 James Croke
1950 James Aylward
1951 Thaddeus Lynch
1952 Martin Cullen
1953 Patrick Browne
1954 Patrick Browne
1955 Thomas Gallagher
1956 Thomas Gallagher
1957 Denis J. Fitzpatrick
1958 Denis J. Fitzpatrick
1959 Richard Jones
1960 James Power
1961 John Griffin
1962 John Griffin
1963 Thomas Brennan
1964 – Patrick Browne
1965 – Patrick Browne
1966 – Patrick Browne
1967 – Thomas Cullen
1968 – William Jones
1969 – William Jones
1970 – Maurice Downey
1971 – Timothy Galvin
1972 – James Quinlan
1973 – Thomas Brennan
1974 – Joseph Cummins
1975 – Edward A. Collins
1976 – William Kenneally
1977 – Timothy Gavin
1978 – Patrick Power
1979 – Stephen Rogers
1980 – Thomas Brennan
1981 – Thomas Browne
1982 – Joseph Cummins
1983 – Richard Jones
1984 – William Kenneally
1985 – Liam Curham
1986 – Brian Swift
1987 – David Daniels
1988 – Brendan Kenneally
1989 – Patrick Power
1990 – Liam Curham
1991 – Hilary Quinlan
1992 – Thomas Browne
1993 – Martin Cullen
1994 – Stephen Rogers
1995 – Maurice Cummins
1996 – Pat Power
1997 – Tom Cunningham
1998 – Brian Swift

1999–2014
1999 – Pat Hayes
2000 – Davy Daniels
2001 – Hilary Quinlan
2002 – Oliver Clery
2003 – Tom Cunningham
2004 – Seamus Ryan
2005 – Davy Daniels
2006 – L. "Cha" O'Neill
2007 – Mary O'Halloran
2008 – Jack Walsh
2009 – John Halligan
2010 – Mary Roche
2011 – Pat Hayes
2012 – Jim Darcy
2013 – John Cummins

2014 - Present

In 2014, Waterford City Council and Waterford County Council were merged by the Local Government Reform Act 2014.  The merged council then had a Mayor for the city and county.  This new council is subdivided into three districts, the Metropolitan District, the Portlaw/Kilmacthomas (formerly Comeragh) District and the Dungarvan/Lismore District. The Metropolitan District, which includes the former city council area, also has a Mayor, the other two districts are headed by a Cathaoirleach (Chairman).

References

Waterford
History of Waterford (city)
Kings of Waterford
Politics of Waterford (city)
Waterford
Lists of Irish monarchs
rulers